Lisa Ann Marcaurelle is an American chemist and a senior executive in multiple biotechnology companies.

Education
Marcaurelle received her B.A. in Chemistry from the College of the Holy Cross in 1997, where she worked with Prof. Timothy Curran on dipeptide scaffolds. She enrolled in UC-Berkeley to pursue a Ph.D. in Chemistry under Carolyn Bertozzi, working on a variety of new glycoside-linking technologies to produce glycoprotein mimetics for natural substances like mucin. Marcaurelle completed a one-year postdoctoral fellowship at the Massachusetts Institute of Technology, working with Peter Seeberger on solid-phase synthesis of oligosaccharides.

Career 
Marcaurelle worked at Infinity Pharmaceuticals and the Broad Institute for a combined 9 years, working in high-throughput chemistry, diversity-oriented chemical synthesis, chemical biology, and medicinal chemistry projects. She was recruited as a Vice President at H3 Biomedicine in 2011. At H3, Marcaurelle instituted and continued to develop a diversity-oriented synthesis platform, based on newly-evolving chemotypes such as spirocycles and macrocycles. In 2016, she became Senior Director of Chemistry at Warp Drive Bio, and in 2018 Vice President of Enko Chem, a venture-backed crop protection start-up in the Boston area. In 2018, she became Senior Director of the DNA Encoded Library Technology Chemistry group at GlaxoSmithKline in Cambridge, MA.

Marcaurelle remains active in professional society volunteering and mentorship of younger scientists in the pharmaceutical industry, and actively advocates for the inclusion of women scientists in leadership roles.

Awards 

 2013 - American Chemical Society WCC "Rising Star" Award
 2013 - McElvain Industrial Seminar, University of Wisconsin
 2011 - Division of Organic Chemistry Young Investigator Symposium
 1997 - American Institute of Chemists Foundation Award
 1996 - Phi Beta Kappa

References 

American pharmacologists
Women pharmacologists
Year of birth missing (living people)
American women chemists
Living people
21st-century American women